General Martinez may refer to:

Jerry P. Martinez (born 1964), U.S. Air Force lieutenant general
Fernando Alejandre Martínez (born 1956), Spanish Army general
Hugo Martínez (police officer), (1941–2020), Colombian police general
Roberto Badillo Martínez (born 1938), Mexican Army general